is a Japanese comedy manga series by Shinichirō Ōe. It has been serialized online via Ōe's Twitter account, as well as Line's Line Manga Indies program, since November 2018 and has been collected in a single tankōbon volume by Enterbrain. An anime television series adaptation by Kachidoki Studio aired from April 8 to July 1, 2020.

Characters

Narrator

Media

Manga

Anime
An anime television series adaptation was announced on December 17, 2019.  The series is animated by Kachidoki Studio and directed by Hiroshi Namiki, with Yu Saito as sound director, and Hiroto Sasaki composing the music. It aired from April 8 to July 1, 2020, on BS NTV. The anime's theme song is  performed by Satoshi Hino.

References

Anime series based on manga
Comedy anime and manga
Enterbrain manga
Japanese webcomics
Kadokawa Dwango franchises
Seinen manga
Webcomics in print